You Have the Right to Remain Silent is the debut extended play by Australian band The Radiators. The ep was released in June 1981 and includes three tracks from the band's debut studio album Feel the Heat, released a year earlier. The ep peaked at number 58 on the Australian Albums Chart and was certified platinum.

Track listing

Charts

References

1981 debut EPs
Indie pop EPs
The Radiators (Australian band) albums
EPs by Australian artists